Shake, Rattle & Roll 13 (stylized onscreen as Shake Rattle Roll 13) is a 2011 Filipino horror anthology film produced by Regal Entertainment, and the thirteenth installment of the Shake, Rattle & Roll film series. It is directed by Richard Somes, Jerrold Tarog and Chris Martinez, and was an official entry to the 2011 Metro Manila Film Festival.

It stars an ensemble cast including Zanjoe Marudo, Maricar Reyes, Kathryn Bernardo, Sam Concepcion, Edgar Allan Guzman, Louise delos Reyes, Celia Rodriguez, Boots Anson-Roa, Jay Manalo, Ara Mina, Dimples Romana, Ervic Vijandre and Eugene Domingo.

The fourteenth installment, Shake, Rattle and Roll Fourteen: The Invasion, was released in 2012.

Plot

"Tamawo"
An old man named Lando (Ronnie Lazaro) has buried something under his house. When he is finished, he encounters a group of white-skinned people. The chieftain (Manu Respall) demands Lando to return something that belongs to them which he refuses. Angered, he and his tribesmen savagely kill him.

Bikbok (Bugoy Cariño) moves to an isolated town with his blind mother Isay (Maricar Reyes), his baby brother and his discontented stepfather Allan (Zanjoe Marudo) to survive poverty where Allan can take charge at the farm after his uncle Lando died earlier. The next day, Allan finds something under the house where he encounters an object that was buried by Lando earlier which reveals to be a crystalline egg. At night, Bikbok watches outside and notices the white creatures watching him.

The next day, Allan's cousin Pey (Ervic Vijandre) takes Isay, Allan and Bikbok to Aling Epang (Celia Rodriguez) to cure their baby. After they leave when Bikbok began to collect some water, he saw a group of sparks and decides to follow it. He stops by where he finds a waterfall and began venturing it. When he plays at the waterfall, he notices the same creatures earlier are watching him. The chieftain orders his tribe to catch him as Bikbok runs. He attempts to escape but the creatures corner him. The chieftain tells him to give back something which it was stolen but Bikbok assures that he and his family didn't steal anything.

The chieftain tells him that if he didn't return it otherwise on the third day at night when the new moon arrives, he and his family will be in danger. Bikbok runs to Aling Epang for help and tells her what he saw. Epang realizes the white creatures were the Tamawos, a group of fairy people who were creatures and tribal warriors who always take away people even children. After Bikbok tells her about what they have stolen, Epang tells him that he needs to find out what they have stolen because the tamawos will never stop until it is returned. Meanwhile, Pey was killed by the tamawos when he encountered them at the forest. At night, Bikbok and his family were attacked by the tamawos with Allan having his foot injured in the process.

After Epang healed his injury, Bikbok tries to tell him his story but Allan distrusts him. Allan walks to the forest and tried to find Pey, where he finds his mutilated body. Horrified and grieved, they decide to leave. When Bikbok enters Allan's room, he finds the crystalline egg with a baby inside, realizing it is the object that the tamawos were looking for. The next day, Allan decides to take revenge on the people who killed Pey where the ranch owner (Rez Cortez) began blaming him on the incident. Out of anger, Allan begrudgingly leaves. He returns to the house driven insane and decides to leave when he finds the egg gone. Outraged, he demands them of the egg.

When Isay tells Bikbok that he stole it, Allan threatens Bikbok but Isay hits him to protect her son. When Allan threatens Isay, she urges Bikbok to escape. He grabs the egg and runs off but Allan chases after him. Meanwhile, the tamawos capture Isay and the baby. Bikbok tries to return the egg, but Allan finds him and attempts to grab the egg. After some struggling, Allan throws the egg, breaking it where the tamawos notice this.

After Allan runs off, the tamawos arrive and see their baby had died which enrages them. Meanwhile, at the cave, Isay finds her baby when the tamawos began abducting. Allan arrives at the cave and fights the tamawos to save her. They begin to escape but the tamawos arrive and corner them. They begin attacking Allan as he begs for mercy but the chieftain refuses for committing everything he had done, telling him that humans are greedy, as the tribe kills him.

With the tamawos about to take Isay, Bikbok runs to them and begs for them to take him instead. The tamawos gently accept his request. Bikbok bids farewell to his mother, and Isay begins to cry in anguish before Epang arrives and they helplessly watch him get taken away by the tamawos.

"Parola"
Best friends Lucy (Kathryn Bernardo) and Shane (Louise delos Reyes) have their camping in a remote province for their report along with the other students. At night, Shane is at the gate of the lighthouse with Lucy's ex-boyfriend Bryan (Sam Concepcion) and began talking to him about Lucy's promise to him. She wants to go inside the lighthouse but Bryan refuses her to get in, assuring it is restricted. Lucy arrives and Shane convinces her to join at the lighthouse. When Lucy reluctantly agreed, the girls enter and began venturing the lighthouse. While Bryan was watching at the lighthouse, Andoy (Hiro Peralta), who was guarding the lighthouse arrives. When the girls reach the top of the lighthouse and enjoy the view, Andoy warns them to go down but Lucy and Shane doesn't believe him. When the girls refuses Andoy's warning, the lighthouse was on. Andoy runs to the lighthouse and tries to get them. At the top, the girls each saw two ghosts. Horrified, they attempt to leave as Andoy arrive, startling them and nearly fell at the lighthouse before he catches them. When he attempts to pull them up, the two ghosts are walking towards them, causing the girls and Andoy to fell down the lighthouse.

Lucy and Shane are in critical condition, but they both survive. Shane gets out of her room to see Lucy. Shane arrives at Lucy's room before Lucy's mother Angelie (Ina Raymundo) asks her mother Beth (Ara Mina) to leave. Before the girls leave, the ghosts from the lighthouse began to follow them. Lucy began to question her mother on why she is mad towards Beth until she tells her that she learned that Beth, a trusted friend, has an affair with her husband Norman (Lloyd Samartino) and tells her to stay away from Shane. Afterwards, the ghosts began tormenting Lucy and Shane to break their friendship.

At school, the girls began to quarrel each other over their families. After the ghosts torments the girls, their tensions grew further when Shane had her hand burned with a gas burner during chemistry class and Lucy mysteriously curses a girl who had been bullying her. Meanwhile, the parents' problem grew further: Shane caught her mother talking to Norman where his wife scolds and forces him to leave which devastates her and Lucy. Shane tries to call Lucy and tried to talk to her on the incident at the lighthouse earlier but Lucy refuses. Suddenly, the ghosts appear and continue tormenting them. The next day, Lucy caught Shane whom Bryan hugged her which causes to break their friendship. Meanwhile, Norman appears and tries to take Beth with him but she tells him to leave. Outraged, he tries to grab her but Shane injures Norman by the ghost's powers.

During class discussion, Bryan tells the story about the lighthouse in the Spanish era before it was constructed at the site where the two rival witches Rowana and Cornelia died in 1879. Rowana (Dimples Romana) attempts to apprehend Cornelia (Julia Clarete) but her family died further until she realized that Cornelia killed them. Rowana decide to avenge her family by killing Cornelia's family. The witches encounter each other and began to fight with their spells. During their fight, Cornelia summons a lightning storm, killing Rowana and herself. After the lighthouse was built, people were omitted to enter the lighthouse because every year during their death anniversary, their ghosts will be awakened and began to tempt and victimize two people who entered the lighthouse to relive their rivalry. Shane overhears this and began to leave. Meanwhile, at the hospital, Norman is in a medical condition until Lucy realizes this and leaves the hospital as well. She arrives at Shane's house and began to attack Beth. Shane arrives at the house and finds her mother near death. She finds Lucy and began to fight. When Shane was about to kill Lucy, Angelie arrives and knocks Shane unconscious. She began to help her daughter but she disappeared along with Shane. The girls are at the lighthouse and the witches' souls possess them. The girls face each other and continue their fight. After they struggle, the girls' consciousness revoke from their trance. They began to apologize to each other and promised that they will never be apart, thus reliving their friendship. But when Rowana and Cornelia's souls were still fighting, Lucy and Shane gets struck by lightning and killed in the lighthouse.

After 6 months, Norman and Angelie reconcile. Afterwards, Norman returns to Beth who has recently given birth to twins. Angelie arrives to take one of the twins as their negotiation. The segment ends with the camera zooming into the ultrasound while Lucy and Shane are heard declaring their everlasting friendship, implying the twins to be the reincarnations of Lucy and Shane.

"Rain Rain Go Away"
During the wrath of Typhoon Ondoy, Cynthia (Eugene Domingo) and her family were forced to leave when their house and their factory flooded. With Cynthia and her husband Mar (Jay Manalo)'s anniversary plans ruined, she went into labor and Mar takes her to the hospital. A news report features Marikina where youth workers died at the factory after the typhoon stopped.

A year later, Cynthia and Mar move into a condominium and they were expecting another baby after their baby died from miscarriage earlier. After working at their new plastic factory, Mar's brother Nante (Edgar Allan Guzman) brought Cynthia back to the condominium to cook dinner. It rained before they left and Cynthia, due to the typhoon, had developed hydrophobia. At the parking lot, Cynthia left Nante and returned to the condominium. While Nante was at the parking lot, water began pouring out of his car. He attempts to escape but water began flooding around his car and drowned him. After his death, the police began questioning the family about Nante's death by drowning. As Cynthia was sleeping, she had a nightmare which involved Nante's body floating in the coffin before she wakes up.

The next day, Cynthia met a wealthy couple buying an old factory and she began to tour them around the place. While there, the man finds the warehouse locked, however, Cynthia decided to show them more around the place. Later, after Cynthia collecting her allowance, she encounters an old woman (Perla Bautista) who returned the donation and gave her warning but then a guard forced her to leave. Cynthia was horrified and she collapsed. After she recovered at the hospital, she noticed children drawing an eye while singing and then returned to the condominium. Cynthia had another nightmare and it involved Mar. She woke up and Mar was nearly drowned while sleeping. After Mar arrived at the apartment, Cynthia began to tell him about her nightmare and the tragedy from the typhoon earlier which Mar disbelieved. That night, Cynthia, Mar, and his mother Maritess (Boots Anson-Roa) and their maid Dina (Tess Antonio) arrived at the factory with a priest to bless it. After the priest left, the old woman, whom Cynthia encountered earlier, was there watching her.

After Cynthia had a baby, she noticed the old lady talking to Dina. Before leaving, Cynthia began to question Dina about what the old lady said. Dina replied that the lady said that she remembered what happened to her father earlier, whom she didn't save from the house fire, and revealing the dead will never rest when nobody saves them. Meanwhile, Mar, who was returning to the condominium, was killed by drowning in an elevator. A series of events followed and as Cynthia escaped from her flooding bathroom, she encountered a group of ghosts. Horrified, she ran and attempted to escape to an elevator where she found Mar's dead body. As Cynthia mourns his death, she gave birth to her baby.

At the hospital, after her baby's birth, both Cynthia and Maritess became guilty about the youth workers who died during the typhoon earlier. It was revealed that Cynthia & her family were responsible for that tragedy. They locked the youth workers in the warehouse at the factory after their shift. Before the arrival of the typhoon and the family began to leave, they beg the family for help until they were killed from the typhoon. Their spirits began to haunt them by killing each of the family members through water. As Maritess began to leave the hospital, she noticed the children still standing in the middle of the road. She was killed when a truck of mineral water hit her. After selling their new factory, Cynthia began to give the donation back to the old woman but the lady refused because her grandchildren have been working to help her grandmother. The lady's grandchildren were among the youth workers who died from the typhoon earlier. Cynthia begged the lady to accept it so that she could leave at peace with her child, which the old lady accepted.

Before leaving, Cynthia returned to the factory and entered the warehouse to pay respects to the deceased youth workers but suddenly she heard the children singing and then it began raining. This scares Cynthia, who silently accepts her fate. The water flooded around Cynthia in the warehouse as the doors were closed and locked where the drowned ghosts are. The last scene shows the glimpse of the ghosts.

Cast

Tamawo
 Zanjoe Marudo as Allan
 Maricar Reyes as Isay
 Bugoy Cariño as Bikbok
 Celia Rodriguez as Aling Epang
 Ervic Vijandre as Pey
 Ronnie Lazaro as Lando
 Rez Cortez as Ranchero
 Manu Raspal as Father Tamawo
 Ryndon Leonard Claver as Mother Tamawo

Parola
 Kathryn Bernardo as Lucy
 Louise delos Reyes as Shane
 Sam Concepcion as Bryan
 Hiro Peralta as Andoy
 Dimples Romana as Rowana
 Julia Clarete as Cornelia
 Ara Mina as Beth
 Ina Raymundo as Angelie
 Lloyd Samartino as Norman
 Lui Villaruz as Class Adviser
 Richard Quan as Husband of Cornelia
 Maurice Mabutas as Daughter of Cornelia
 Katrina Napigkit as Cornelia's Double
 Laiza Lambino as Mean Girl 1
 Queenie Santiago as Mean Girl 2

Rain Rain Go Away 
 Eugene Domingo as Cynthia Gomez
 Jay Manalo as Mar Gomez
 Edgar Allan Guzman as Nante Gomez
 Boots Anson-Roa as Maritess Gomez
 Perla Bautista as Old Woman
 Tess Antonio as Dina
 Dexter Doria as Mrs. Reyes
 Fonz Deza as Mr. Reyes
 Rollie Innocencio as Priest
 Jeffrey Cantuba as Priest Assistant
 Ria Garcia as Ghost 1
 Dylan Ray Talon as Ghost 2
 Jerick Bodota as Ghost 3
 Nathaniel Britt as Street Kid 1
 Nicolette Flordeliza as Street Kid 2
 Marioneth Ordonez as Street Kid 3

Reception

Critical response
The film has been graded with an "A" by the Cinema Evaluation Board of the Philippines.

In a review for ClickTheCity.com, Philbert Ortiz Dy described the film as a worthy anthology rating it with 4 out of a possible 5 stars. The film serves as a nice showcase of local talent and the 'Parola' episode itself is "worth the price of admission." Its weaknesses include the overall length and unevenness in regards to the two other episodes paling in comparison with Parola's quality and impact.

However, PEP.ph's Abby Mendoza was more appreciative of the film pointing out how unique the storytelling elements, themes and performances of each episode made Shake, Rattle & Roll 13 a film that does "more than creep one out."

Accolades

Notes
The word "Tamawo" is very much close to "Maligno" (a Tagalog word which means monstrous, or eerie creature); an Ilonggo word.

See also
Shake, Rattle & Roll (film series)
List of ghost films

References

External links

http://trendingnewsnow.blogspot.com/2011/11/shake-rattle-and-roll-13-movie-poster.html
https://archive.today/20130416081905/http://blogs.pep.ph/mmff2011/?p=301

Philippine supernatural horror films
Philippine disaster films
Shake, Rattle & Roll films
Films about natural disasters in the Philippines
2010s Tagalog-language films
Films directed by Jerrold Tarog
Regal Entertainment films